In a Special Way is the third studio album by American R&B group DeBarge, released by Gordy Records on September 24, 1983. It was recorded at Kendun Records in Burbank and Westlake Audio in West Hollywood; written and produced by lead vocalist El DeBarge with additional writing by Mark, James and Bunny DeBarge.

In a Special Way was certified gold in the United States after the release of the singles "Time Will Reveal" and "Love Me in a Special Way", which hit number one on the Billboard R&B and adult contemporary singles chart. The album is most memorable for not only its singles but album tracks such as "Stay with Me" and "A Dream" - largely due to subsequent sampling in modern hip-hop and R&B tracks.  The album has been regarded by some critics as the "classic" in the family group's catalog.

Background and recording
Group member Bunny DeBarge revealed the group were given complete creative control because Motown Records founder Berry Gordy liked their sound. Gordy also liked the sound of their brothers' band Switch - who were also signed to Motown - which prompted him to sign DeBarge as well. Originally performing as a gospel group, the siblings changed to performing secular music after gospel music labels didn't know how to market them. After making the move to Los Angeles, DeBarge signed with a small label Source Records- much to Bunny's chagrin. She asked the record company CEO to let them out of their contract, to which he obliged. Their older brother Bobby DeBarge set up a meeting with Jermaine Jackson and Hazel Gordy to sign with Motown as Jermaine and Hazel were also responsible for bringing Switch to the label. Due to them still being contractually obligated to another label at the time, they couldn't speak to the group, as it would have been seen as a breach of contract. After waiting out the label release, the group met with Jackson and were signed to Motown.

The group recorded their 1981 debut album, The DeBarges, which failed to chart due to lack of promotion. Things changed for them with the release of their second album, All This Love, due to the success of the singles "I Like It" and the album's title track. They went back in the studio in 1983 to record the follow up In a Special Way. The siblings recorded the album with the promise that each member got a song to sing by themselves. In the end, it was determined that each member would be given two songs to do for the album. According to Bunny, In a Special Way took a few months to record. The reason for it was to give the group time to work out the songs before the recording process to know where they were going with the material.

Mark DeBarge was initially scheduled to sing lead on "Stay With Me", although no one could locate his whereabouts. At the time, the song was unfinished and the group was hoping to get Mark's input. In the end, Bunny and El were forced to complete the song, with El having to perform lead vocals at the last minute. Bunny also liked the song "Need Somebody", but felt it sounded better before it was mixed. As the track was sent to be mixed, she felt "Need Somebody" lost a lot during the mixing process - feeling it sounded watered down. Bunny also revealed that "Love Me In a Special Way" was originally conceived as a gospel song. The group also wanted to revisit the material from their debut album, for which they felt was mishandled. They decided to use two songs from the album: "Queen Of My Heart", which was included on In a Special Way, while "Share My World" would be included on their next album, Rhythm of the Night. The song "I Give Up On You" was written by James DeBarge with their labelmate Billy Preston and later recorded the song at Preston's house.

Recording engineer Barney Perkins was particularly fond of the album's closing track "A Dream" and played it every time the group came to the studio to record. As they were close to finishing the project, Berry Gordy imposed a deadline for them to complete the album.

Music and lyrics 
According to the Lexington Herald-Leader, the album's material veers between "ballad and dance music, somewhere between soul and jazz." AllMusic's Jason Elias attributed its "minimalist and artful sound" to the rumor that the horn tracks were lost during its recording.

Critical reception 

In a contemporary review, Connie Johnson of the Los Angeles Times wrote that DeBarge "conveys an innocence that's rare in '80s pop music" and, although some songs can be excessively "cute" and sung high-pitched, they are "oddly appealing." The Philadelphia Inquirer wrote that In a Special Way "makes gentle, perfect harmonies seem like a pleasurable dream." The Lexington Herald-Leader largely credited El DeBarge's soft vocals and upbeat arrangements for the group's success on the album and asserted that they appear to be "the future" of Motown. Robert Christgau, writing in The Village Voice, said that he "fell in love with the austere lilt and falsetto fantasy they've pinned to plastic here" because of their superior vocal skills. Christgau felt that its music guilelessly pursues genuine vocal "beauty" and is strengthened by subtle Latinized rhythms. He named In a Special Way the tenth best album of the year in his list for the Pazz & Jop annual critics' poll.

In a decade-end list for The Village Voice, Christgau ranked the album as the seventh best of the 1980s. In his "A+" review of the album in 2002, music critic Milo Miles said that In a Special Way is still the least known of Motown's best albums and called it "a crucial work whose appeal cannot be articulated entirely." Miles praised DeBarge for avoiding "cheap sentiment" in favor of an emphasis on love and wrote that the album achieved "the most elusive prize" in popular music—"romance that is both sensuous and gorgeous and then sustained track after track".

Track listing

Personnel

DeBarge 
 Bunny DeBarge – lead vocals, backing vocals, rhythm arrangements
 James DeBarge – backing vocals, rhythm arrangements
 El DeBarge – lead vocals, backing vocals, keyboards, rhythm arrangements
 Randy DeBarge – backing vocals
 Mark DeBarge – backing vocals
 Bobby DeBarge – backing vocals

Additional personnel 
 Larry Von Nash – keyboards (6)
 Greg Phillinganes – keyboards (8)
 Michael Boddicker – synthesizer programming 
 Charles Fearing – guitars 
 Paul Jackson, Jr. – guitars
 Carlos Rios – guitar solo (7)
 Nathan East – bass
 James Jamerson, Jr. – bass
 "Ready" Freddie Washington – bass 
 Leon "Ndugu" Chancler – drums 
 Ricky Lawson – drums 
 Harvey Mason – drums 
 Paulinho da Costa – percussion
 Stevie Wonder – harmonica solo (5)
 Jim Gilstrap – additional backing vocals 
 Bunny Hull – additional backing vocals

Production 
 Eldra DeBarge – producer 
 Bobby DeBarge – associate producer 
 Barney Perkins – recording, mixing 
 Steve Bates – assistant engineer 
 Chris Bellman – assistant engineer 
 Walter Borchers – assistant engineer 
 Dan Marnien – assistant engineer 
 John Matousek – mastering at Motown Recording Studios (Los Angeles, California).
 Suzee Ikeda – product manager 
 Johnny Lee – art direction 
 Janet Levinson – design 
 Ron Slenzak – photography 
 Valadé / Design Pool – styling

Charts

Singles

Certifications

References

Further reading

External links
 DeBarge-In A Special Way at Discogs

1983 albums
DeBarge albums
Gordy Records albums